The 1965 Montana State Bobcats football team was an American football team that represented Montana State University in the Big Sky Conference during the 1965 NCAA College Division football season. In its third season under head coach Jim Sweeney, the team compiled a 3–7 record (1–3 against Big Sky opponents) and finished last in the conference.

Schedule

References

Montana State
Montana State Bobcats football seasons
Montana State Bobcats football